The Boggs Avenue Elementary School in the Mount Washington neighborhood of Pittsburgh, Pennsylvania is a building from 1925. It was listed on the National Register of Historic Places in 1987.

References

School buildings on the National Register of Historic Places in Pennsylvania
Renaissance Revival architecture in Pennsylvania
School buildings completed in 1925
Schools in Pittsburgh
Pittsburgh History & Landmarks Foundation Historic Landmarks
National Register of Historic Places in Pittsburgh
1925 establishments in Pennsylvania